Two-time defending champion Ivan Lendl defeated Mats Wilander in the final, 6–7(7–9), 6–0, 7–6(7–4), 6–4 to win the men's singles tennis title at the 1987 US Open.

Seeds
The seeded players are listed below. Ivan Lendl is the champion; others show the round in which they were eliminated.

Draw

Key
 Q = Qualifier
 WC = Wild card
 LL = Lucky loser
 r = Retired

Final eight

Section 1

Section 2

Section 3

Section 4

Section 5

Section 6

Section 7

Section 8

External links
 Association of Tennis Professionals (ATP) – 1987 US Open Men's Singles draw
1987 US Open – Men's draws and results at the International Tennis Federation

Men's singles
US Open (tennis) by year – Men's singles